Francis de Sales Lewental was a Polish Jewish publisher; born at Włocławek, Congress Poland, 1839; died at Wiesbaden on 24 September 1902. In 1862 Lewental, the son of poor Jewish parents, bought with his accumulated savings the press of the Warsaw publisher  (died 1859), and began his career with the Kalendarz Ludowy, a popular almanac, which he continued until 1866. In 1865, in conjunction with others, he founded , an illustrated weekly, which in the next year became his exclusive property. In 1871 Lewental bought the Kółko Domowe, a home magazine, and transformed it into the popular Tygodnik Romansów i Powieści (discontinued in 1900). Lewental was the proprietor also of the Świt, edited for a few years by Maria Konopnicka. In 1871, also, he issued an edition of the works of Korzeniowski (better-known in the English-speaking world as Joseph Conrad), which proved so popular that it led later to similar editions of the works of Kraszewski, Kremer, Rzewuski, Skarbek, Fredro, Syrokomla, Eliza Orzeszkowa, Kaczkowski, Bałucki, etc.

In 1874 Lewental commenced the publication of the best productions of European literature under the title "Biblioteka Najcelniejszych Utworow Literatury Europejskiej." The John Matejko Album and many other well-known works were issued from his press. In 1887 Lewental became one of the proprietors of the Kurier Warszawski. Though he avoided politics he did not succeed in escaping a conflict with the Russian government; he was arrested in 1900, was compelled to discontinue all his publications, and was sentenced to deportation for three years to Odessa. After a year there he obtained a passport for foreign travel. Lewental enjoyed the friendship of many literati, among them being J. I. Kraszewski, for whose release from imprisonment at Magdeburg he offered to furnish the bail required by the Prussian government.

References

1839 births
1902 deaths
19th-century Polish Jews
People from Włocławek
Polish publishers (people)